The 2000 United States presidential election in Wyoming took place on November 7, 2000, and was part of the 2000 United States presidential election. Voters chose three representatives, or electors to the Electoral College, who voted for president and vice president.

Wyoming was won by incumbent Texas Governor George W. Bush by a massive 40.06% margin of victory, and his 67.76% of the popular vote made the state his strongest victory in the 2000 election. He was accompanied on the Republican ticket by vice presidential nominee Dick Cheney, formerly a member of the U.S. House of Representatives from Wyoming's at-large district. , this is the last time a Republican won Teton County, and thus is also the last time a nominee of any party carried every county in the state, even though subsequent Republican nominees such as Donald Trump have exceeded Bush's share of the overall vote in Wyoming.

Results

By county

Counties that flipped from Democratic to Republican
Albany (Largest city: Laramie)
Sweetwater (Largest city: Rock Springs)
Teton (Largest city: Jackson)

By congressional district
Due to the state's low population, only one congressional district is allocated. This district, called the At-Large district, because it covers the entire state, and thus is equivalent to the statewide election results.

Electors

The electors of each state and the District of Columbia met on December 18, 2000 to cast their votes for president and vice president. The Electoral College itself never meets as one body. Instead the electors from each state and the District of Columbia met in their respective capitols.

The following were the members of the Electoral College from the state. All were pledged to and voted for George Bush and Dick Cheney:
Judy Catchpole
Gale Geringer
John Patton

See also
 United States presidential elections in Wyoming
 Presidency of George W. Bush

References

Wyoming
2000
Presidential